Charles Theodore Russell (November 20, 1815 – January 16, 1896) was a Massachusetts politician who served in both branches of the Massachusetts legislature and as the Mayor of Cambridge, Massachusetts.  Russell was the father of Cambridge Mayor and Massachusetts Governor William E. Russell.

See also
 1877 Massachusetts legislature
 1878 Massachusetts legislature

Notes

1815 births
Mayors of Cambridge, Massachusetts
Massachusetts city council members
Members of the Massachusetts House of Representatives
Massachusetts state senators
1896 deaths
19th-century American politicians
Harvard College alumni